Robert Archambeau (18 April 1933 — 25 April 2022) was a Canadian ceramic artist and potter. He also had an academic career in post-secondary art studies.

Personal history 
Born in Toledo, Ohio, United States in 1933, he immigrated to Canada in 1968. He served four years in the U.S. Marines, before undergraduate Studies at Toledo University, the Toledo Museum of Art School and Bowling Green State University where he graduated with a Bachelor of Fine Arts. He earned his Masters of Fine Arts degree from New York State College of Ceramics on the campus of Alfred University in 1964. In addition to his prominence in the field of ceramic art, he was known as an educator and an art collector. These three facets of his career are chronicled in the exhibition catalogue Robert Archambeau: Artist, Teacher, Collector, with essays by Helen Delacretaz and Edward Lebow. His son, also named Robert Archambeau, is a poet and literary critic, whose works include the books Word Play Place, Home and Variations, and Laureates and Heretics.

Body of work 
His work, heavily influenced by Japanese ceramics, has been exhibited internationally. His works are held in many major public and private collections around the world. While living in Japan he worked closely with the artist Akio Takamori and in the studio of Jun Kaneko. He is particularly noted for his production of wood fired ceramics. He also worked closely with painter Don Reichert, who was a colleague at the University of Manitoba. Both artists operated studios in the remote Canadian town of Bissett, Manitoba.

Academic career
He was Professor Emeritus of Art at the University of Manitoba, where he taught for 23 years, retiring in 1991.  He also taught at the Rhode Island School of Design.

Awards and prizes

In 2003 he became an artist laureate recipient of the Governor General's Award in Visual and Media Arts, Canada's highest artistic honor.  In 2008 he was awarded a Lifetime Achievement Award at the annual NCECA conference held in Pittsburgh, Pennsylvania.

Bibliography 
 Delacretaz, Helen, and Edward Lebow (2004).  Robert Archambeau: Artist, Teacher, Collector, exhibition catalogue, curated by Helen Delacretaz.  Winnipeg: Winnipeg Art Gallery. .

External links 
 Virtual Museum

References

1933 births
Living people
Canadian ceramists
Canadian potters
New York State College of Ceramics alumni
Bowling Green State University alumni
Governor General's Award in Visual and Media Arts winners
Rhode Island School of Design faculty
Academic staff of the University of Manitoba
United States Marines